Events in the year 1992 in Spain.

Incumbents 
 Monarch – Juan Carlos I
 Prime Minister of Spain – Felipe González Márquez

Events 
26 May – 1991 Spanish local elections are held, to elect 66,308 councillors in the 8,060 municipalities of Spain and 1,032 seats in 38 provincial deputations.

Popular culture

Music
 Spain, represented by Sergio Dalma, finishes 4th in the Eurovision Song Contest with 119 points.

Film
See List of Spanish films of 1991

Television 
The comedy series, Farmacia de guardia, is launched.

Literature 
 El caballero de Sajonia by Juan Benet Goitia

Sport

Notable births 
9 January – Álvaro Soler, singer
21 January – Javier Calvo, actor and director
6 February – Maxi Iglesias, actor and model
11 April – Thiago Alcântara, footballer
15 April – Javier Fernandez, figure skater
10 June – Pol Espargaró, motorcycle racer
1 July – Lucas Vázquez, footballer
13 October – Diego Domínguez, Spanish actor and singer

Notable deaths 
 5 February – Pedro Arrupe, priest (born 1907)
 6 February – María Zambrano, essayist and philosopher (born 1904)

References

 
Spain
Years of the 20th century in Spain
Spain